Chałupki  is a village in the administrative district of Gmina Szczekociny, within Zawiercie County, Silesian Voivodeship, in southern Poland.

Train crash

On March 3, 2012 a train crash took place in Chałupki, when two passenger trains collided head-on. 16 passengers were killed. The incident provoked condolences from the leaders of a number of European countries.

References

Villages in Zawiercie County